Magic Valley Regional Airport , also known as Joslin Field, is a public use airport located four nautical miles (7 km) south of the central business district of Twin Falls, Idaho. The airport is owned by the City and County of Twin Falls. It is mostly used for general aviation but is also served by two commercial airlines.

As per the Federal Aviation Administration, this airport had 29,606 passenger boardings (enplanements) in calendar year 2008, 26,991 in 2009, and 35,576 in 2010. The National Plan of Integrated Airport Systems for 2011–2015 categorized it as a primary commercial service airport.

Facilities and aircraft

For the 12-month period ending January 1, 2020, the airport had 34,611 aircraft operations, an average of 95 per day: 82% general aviation, 14% air taxi, 3% military, and 1% scheduled commercial. At that time there were 111 aircraft based at this airport: 84 single-engine, 18 multi-engine, 8 helicopter, and 1 jet.

Historical airline service

Prop Service 
West Coast Airlines and its successors Air West, Hughes Airwest and Republic Airlines (1979–1986) served the airport for many years. In 1954, West Coast was serving Twin Falls with nonstop Douglas DC-3 flights to Boise and Burley/Rupert with direct service to Pocatello and Idaho Falls as well as connecting flights to Portland, OR and Boeing Field in Seattle WA. By 1960, West Coast had updated their aircraft to the Fairchild F-27, which flew direct to Twin Falls from Boise, Salt Lake City, and Seattle Boeing Field.  

In 1968, West Coast merged with Bonanza Air Lines and Pacific Air Lines to form Air West which continued to serve Twin Falls. During this time, Air West was still operating Fairchild F-27 in 1968, which had nonstop flights to Boise, Salt Lake City, Phoenix and Spokane. According to the July 1, 1968 Air West system timetable, Twin Falls was receiving some form of international service at this time, which consisted of a flight on Fairchild F-27, which flew flights to and from Calgary with an intermediate stops in Spokane, Boise and some other smaller cities in north eastern and western Idaho and Washington State. about this time, Air West changed their name to Hughes Airwest which continued to serve Twin Falls.

The Jet Age 
The jet age arrived in Twin Falls during the early 1970s. In 1972, Hughes Airwest operated all flights into Twin Falls, Idaho with Douglas DC-9-10 and McDonnell Douglas DC-9-30 Aircraft, which operated nonstop service to Boise, Salt Lake City, Los Angeles (LAX), Las Vegas, Seattle, Spokane, Burbank and some other destinations. The July 1, 1972 Hughes Airwest system timetable stated that Twin Falls was the "jet gateway" for the Sun Valley, Idaho summer and ski resort area as the Friedman Memorial Airport (SUN) serving Sun Valley did not have airline jet flights at this time and was only served by commuter air carriers operating turboprop and prop aircraft during the 1970s. By 1975, Hughes Airwest was continuing to operate all flights into Twin Falls with DC-9-10 and DC-9-30 jets with nonstop service to Boise, Salt Lake City, Stockton, Pocatello, San Francisco (SFO), Los Angeles (LAX), Orange County, Las Vegas, Seattle, Portland, OR, Spokane and Idaho Falls. During the ski season in early 1976, the airline had added nonstop DC-9 flights between Twin Falls and both Los Angeles (LAX) and San Francisco (SFO) which were operated only on Saturdays.  

According to the February 1, 1976 Official Airline Guide, Hughes Airwest was the only airline operating jet service into Twin Falls at this time with eight DC-9 jet flights a day operated to the airport on Saturdays with a lesser number of jet flights operated on other days of the week. This same OAG also lists direct, no change of plane DC-9 flights operated from Los Angeles, San Francisco, Las Vegas, Seattle, Portland, OR, Santa Ana/Orange County, Santa Barbara, Spokane, Idaho Falls and Lewiston, ID in addition to daily nonstop DC-9 flights from Boise, Salt Lake City, Stockton, CA and Pocatello. In 1980, the airline was still operating DC-9 jet service nonstop to Boise and Salt Lake City with one stop direct flights to Burbank, Phoenix and Portland, OR as well as direct, no change of plane DC-9 flights to Seattle, Spokane and Tucson. 

Hughes Airwest was then acquired by and merged into Republic Airlines (1979-1986) which continued to serve Twin Falls. In 1982, Republic was operating DC-9 jet service from the airport nonstop to Boise, Salt Lake City and Pocatello with direct, no change of plane flights to Seattle, Spokane and Burbank. By 1984, Western Airlines was serving Twin Falls on a seasonal basis with nonstop flights to Los Angeles (LAX) operated with Boeing 737-200 jetliners. However, by 1985, both Republic and Western had ceased serving Twin Falls and the airport no longer had jet service at this time. Jet service then briefly returned in early 1993 when Morris Air was operating nonstop Boeing 737-300 flights to Salt Lake City.

Current service at the Airport 
Several commuter air carriers also served Twin Falls over the years. In the early 1970s, Trans Magic Airlines (TMA), which was based in Twin Falls, was operating a hub at the airport with flights to Boise, Burley, Coeur d'Alene, Idaho Falls, Jackpot, Lewiston, McCall, Mountain Home Air Force Base, Moscow, Pocatello, Pullman, Salt Lake City and Sun Valley with this commuter airline flying de Havilland Heron four engine prop aircraft and Piper Navajo twin engine prop aircraft. By 1974, Air Idaho was operating a small hub at the airport with nonstop service to Boise, Burley, Elko, Salt Lake City and Sun Valley flown with de Havilland Heron aircraft. In 1976, another commuter air carrier, Sun Valley Key Airlines, was serving Twin Falls with flights from Salt Lake City and Pocatello operated with Piper Navajo prop aircraft while Air Idaho was continuing to operate flights from Salt Lake City and Sun Valley with the de Havilland Heron. Cascade Airways briefly served Twin Falls in 1980 with nonstop flights to Boise and Salt Lake City operated with Embraer EMB-110 Bandeirante commuter turboprops. In 1981, Mountain West Airlines-Idaho was operating nonstop flights to Boise with Embraer EMB-110 Bandeirante turboprops. Skywest Airlines began serving Twin Falls as an independent commuter airline during the early 1980s and by 1983 was operating nonstop flights to Salt Lake City and Pocatello with Swearingen Metro III commuter propjets. Also in 1983, Transwestern Airlines was operating nonstop flights to Boise and Salt Lake City with Swearingen Metro III commuter propjets. Later in 1983, Transwestern was then acquired by and merged into Horizon Air which in turn continued to operate nonstop flights to Boise and Salt Lake City with Swearingen Metro III propjets. Horizon continued service to Twin Falls for fourteen years, until April 1997.

In 1987, SkyWest Airlines was operating as Western Express on behalf of Western Airlines via a code sharing agreement with nonstop flights to Salt Lake City and Pocatello operated Swearingen Metro III propjets. Western was then acquired by and merged into Delta Air Lines later in 1987 with SkyWest then becoming a Delta Connection air carrier via a code sharing agreement with Delta and this business relationship between the two airlines has been in effect since that time. In 1994, there were two airlines serving Twin Falls: Horizon Air operating code share service on behalf of Alaska Airlines with nonstop Swearingen Metro III service to Boise and SkyWest operating Delta Connection service nonstop to Salt Lake City with Embraer EMB-120 Brasilia propjets. By 1999, SkyWest flying as the Delta Connection was the only airline serving Twin Falls and was continuing to operate nonstop Embraer EMB-120 Brasila flights to Salt Lake City. SkyWest is currently the only airline operating scheduled passenger flights from the airport and has served Twin Falls for over 35 years.

Airlines and destinations

SkyWest Airlines, operating as Delta Connection on behalf of Delta Air Lines via a code sharing agreement, operates Canadair CRJ200 regional jet flights nonstop to Salt Lake City (SLC).

Statistics

References

External links
 Airport page at City of Twin Falls website 
 Reeder Flying Service, the fixed-base operator
 Aerial image as of July 1992 from USGS The National Map
 
 
 

Airports in Idaho
Twin Falls, Idaho
Transportation in Twin Falls County, Idaho
Buildings and structures in Twin Falls County, Idaho